Polyommatus amandus, the Amanda's blue, is a butterfly of the family Lycaenidae. It is found in the Palearctic realm.

Description

The upperside of the male's wings is a silvery blue or sky blue, often, but not always, with a broad dark border and a narrow black marginal line with an outermost white line. The upperside of the female's wings is in some populations dark blue edged with brown but in other populations is medium brown with a row of orange half-moon shaped lunules near the edges. The hind margin has red blotches. The underside of the male's wings are light grey with white-edged black blotches. The underside of the female's wings is similar but they are a rich creamy-brown colour with red blotches, especially on the margins of the hindwings and a series of black spots with white rims, often touching, forming a row parallel to the margin of the wings. The basal areas of the underwings are turquoise.

Distribution and habitat
Amanda's blue is native to much of central and northern Europe. Its habitat is meadows, heaths, grassland, roadsides and other open areas and places where the larval food plants grow and usually at altitudes of at least .

Life cycle
This butterfly flies from May to August. The larvae feed on species of vetch, often meadow vetchling (Lathyrus pratensis) and tufted vetch (Vicia cracca). The males fly around near the host plants waiting for females to arrive. The females lay their eggs singly on the leaves of the host plant. The caterpillars have glands which secrete a sugary fluid that attracts ants and the presence of these protects the larvae from predators.

References

Polyommatus
Butterflies described in 1792
Butterflies of Europe